John Arthur Jackson (30 November 1862 – 25 November 1937) was a businessman and a British Conservative Party politician from Cumberland.

Jackson was educated at St Peter's, York.

His business career included a senior partnership with Timber Merchants J. & W. Jackson, chairmanship of the Whitehaven Colliery Company and a directorship with the Furness Railway Company.

He was elected at the general election in January 1910 as Member of Parliament (MP) for Whitehaven, but lost his seat at the December 1910 election.

Personal
He was the second recorded son of John Jackson of Hensingham House in Cumberland.   In 1892 he married the fourth daughter of James Marshall Hill of Greenock: the couple had a daughter.

References

External links 

Conservative Party (UK) MPs for English constituencies
UK MPs 1910
1862 births
1937 deaths
People educated at St Peter's School, York